Senator MacDonald may refer to:

Allan Macdonald (1794–1862), New York State Senate
John L. MacDonald (1838–1903), Minnesota State Senate
Mark MacDonald (Vermont politician) (born 1942), Vermont State Senate
Michael D. MacDonald (fl. 2010s), Michigan State Senate
Moses Macdonald (1815–1869), Maine State Senate
Robert J. MacDonald (1914–1987), Michigan State Senate
Virginia B. MacDonald (1920–2008), Illinois State Senate

See also
Senator McDonald (disambiguation)